Harlan Carey Brewster (November 10, 1870 – March 1, 1918) was a politician in British Columbia, Canada. Brewster arrived in British Columbia in 1893 and had various careers working on a ship and then in a cannery. He eventually became owner of his own canning company. He was elected to the provincial legislature in the 1907 election and was one of only two Liberals elected to the legislature in the 1909 election.

Brewster became leader of the opposition, and was elected party leader in March 1912. He lost his seat a few weeks later in the 1912 election, which returned no Liberals at all. In 1916, he won election to the legislature again through a by-election, and led his party to victory in a general election later that year by campaigning on a reform platform. Brewster promised to end patronage in the civil service, end political machines, improve workmen's compensation and labour laws, bring in votes for women, and other progressive reforms.

In government, Carey brought in women's suffrage, instituted prohibition, and combatted political corruption before his unexpected death in 1918. He is interred in the Ross Bay Cemetery in Victoria, British Columbia.

External links
 
Biography at the Dictionary of Canadian Biography Online

1870 births
1918 deaths
Premiers of British Columbia
Canadian Baptists
Leaders of the British Columbia Liberal Party
British Columbia Liberal Party MLAs
19th-century Baptists